La Crème de la crème (also titled Smart Ass) is a 2014 French comedy-drama film directed by Kim Chapiron. The film received three nominations at the 20th Lumières Awards, where Thomas Blumenthal and Jean-Baptiste Lafarge were nominated for Most Promising Actor and Alice Isaaz for Most Promising Actress.

Cast 
 Thomas Blumenthal as Dan 
 Alice Isaaz as Kelly 
 Jean-Baptiste Lafarge as Louis 
 Karim Ait M'Hand as Jaffar 
 Marine Sainsily as Eulalie
 Marianne Denicourt as Louis' mother
 Bruno Abraham-Kremer as Dan's father
 Jenna Thiam as Photocopy shop girl
 Noémie Merlant as The redhead
 Lucas Bravo as Antoine Mufla

References

External links 
 

2014 films
2014 comedy-drama films
2010s French-language films
French comedy-drama films
2010s French films